Logan County is a county in the U.S. state of Nebraska. As of the 2020 census, the population was 716. Its county seat is Stapleton.

Logan County is part of the North Platte, NE Micropolitan Statistical Area.

In the Nebraska license plate system, Logan County is represented by the prefix 87 (it had the eighty-seventh-largest number of vehicles registered in the county when the license plate system was established in 1922).

History
Logan County was formed in 1885. It was named for Civil War General John A. Logan.

The first railroad was built through Logan County in 1911.

Geography
The terrain of Logan County consists of low corrugated flatland, sparsely used for agricultural purposes at present. The ground slopes to the east-northeast, with precipitation runoff making its way to the Dismal River north of Logan County.

Major highways
  U.S. Highway 83
  Nebraska Highway 92

Adjacent counties

 Thomas County - north
 Blaine County - northeast
 Custer County - east
 Lincoln County - south
 McPherson County - west

Demographics

As of the 2000 United States Census, there 774 people, 316 households, and 229 families residing in the county. The population density was 1 people per square mile (1/km2). There were 386 housing units at an average density of 1 per square mile (0/km2). The racial makeup of the county was 98.58% White, 0.13% Black or African American, 1.03% Native American, and 0.26% from two or more races. 0.90% of the population were Hispanic or Latino of any race.

There were 316 households, out of which 29.70% had children under the age of 18 living with them, 66.50% were married couples living together, 3.80% had a female householder with no husband present, and 27.50% were non-families. 25.00% of all households were made up of individuals, and 12.70% had someone living alone who was 65 years of age or older. The average household size was 2.45 and the average family size was 2.95.

The county population contained 27.30% under the age of 18, 4.40% from 18 to 24, 24.00% from 25 to 44, 26.70% from 45 to 64, and 17.60% who were 65 years of age or older. The median age was 42 years. For every 100 females, there were 99.00 males. For every 100 females age 18 and over, there were 99.60 males.

The median income for a household in the county was $33,125, and the median income for a family was $38,958. Males had a median income of $26,250 versus $18,906 for females. The per capita income for the county was $14,937. About 6.50% of families and 10.50% of the population were below the poverty line, including 13.10% of those under age 18 and 9.60% of those age 65 or over.

Communities

Villages 

 Gandy
 Stapleton (county seat)

Unincorporated communities 

 Hoagland
 Logan

Politics
Logan County voters have been reliably Republican for many decades. In only one national election since 1936 has the county selected the Democratic Party candidate (as of 2020).

References

 
Nebraska counties
North Platte Micropolitan Statistical Area
1885 establishments in Nebraska
Populated places established in 1885